The Royal Swedish Academy of Sciences is one of the royal academies of Sweden. Founded on 2 June 1739, it is an independent, non-governmental scientific organization that takes special responsibility for promoting natural sciences and mathematics and strengthening their influence in society, whilst endeavouring to promote the exchange of ideas between various disciplines.

The goals of the academy are:
 to be a forum where researchers meet across subject boundaries,
 to offer a unique environment for research,
 to provide support to younger researchers,
 to reward outstanding research efforts,
 to communicate internationally among scientists,
 to advance the case for science within society and to influence research policy priorities
 to stimulate interest in mathematics and science in school, and
 to disseminate and popularize scientific information in various forms.

Every year, the academy awards the Nobel Prizes in physics and chemistry, the Sveriges Riksbank Prize in Economic Sciences in Memory of Alfred Nobel, the Crafoord Prize, the Sjöberg Prize and several other awards. The academy maintains close relations with foreign academies, learned societies and international scientific organizations and also promotes international scientific cooperation. The Academy of Sciences is located within the Stockholm region's Royal National City Park.

Prizes

International prizes 
 Nobel Prizes in Physics and in Chemistry
 Sveriges Riksbank Prize in Economic Sciences in Memory of Alfred Nobel
 Crafoord Prizes in astronomy and mathematics, geosciences, biosciences (with an emphasis on ecology), and polyarthritis (for example rheumatoid arthritis)
 Sjöberg Prize for research in cancer
 Rolf Schock Prizes in logic and philosophy, mathematics, visual arts and musical arts
 Gregori Aminoff Prize in crystallography
 Tobias Prize for research to treat hematological disorders
 Gold Medal for Radiation Protection

National prizes 
 Göran Gustafsson Prize for research in chemistry, mathematics, molecular biology, medicine and physics
 Söderberg Prize for research in economics or jurisprudence or medicine
 Ingvar Lindqvist Prizes for teachers in the fields of physics, chemistry, biology, mathematics and natural sciences
 Tage Erlander Prize "for research in natural sciences and technology" in four fields (physics, chemistry, technology and biology)

Members 
The academy has elected about 1,700 Swedish and 1,200 foreign members since it was founded in 1739. Today the academy has about 470 Swedish and 175 foreign members which are divided into ten "classes", representing ten various scientific disciplines:
 Mathematics
 Astronomy and space science
 Physics
 Chemistry
 Geosciences
 Biosciences
 Medical sciences
 Engineering sciences
 Social sciences
 Humanities and "for outstanding services to science"

List of Secretary Generals 

The following persons have served as permanent secretaries of the academy:
 Anders Johan von Höpken, 1739–1740, 1740–1741
 Augustin Ehrensvärd, April – June 1740
 Jacob Faggot, 1741–1744
 Pehr Elvius, 1744–1749
 Pehr Wilhelm Wargentin, 1749–1783
 Johan Carl Wilcke and Henrik Nicander, 1784–1796
 Daniel Melanderhjelm and Henrik Nicander, 1796–1803
 Jöns Svanberg and Carl Gustaf Sjöstén 1803–1808; Sjöstén was removed 1808 for negligence of his duties
 Jöns Svanberg, 1809–1811
 Olof Swartz, 1811–1818
 Jöns Jacob Berzelius, 1818–1848
 Peter Fredrik Wahlberg, 1848–1866
 Georg Lindhagen, 1866–1901
 Christopher Aurivillius, 1901–1923
 Henrik Gustaf Söderbaum, 1923–1933
 Henning Pleijel, 1933–1943
 Arne Westgren, 1943–1959
 Erik Rudberg, 1959–1972
 Carl Gustaf Bernhard, 1973–1980
 Tord Ganelius, 1981–1989
 Carl-Olof Jacobson, 1989–1997
 Erling Norrby, 1997–30 June 2003
 Gunnar Öquist, 1 July 2003 – 30 June 2010
 Staffan Normark, 1 July 2010 – 30 June 2015
 Göran K. Hansson, 1 July 2015 – 31 December 2021
 Hans Ellegren, 1 January 2022–present

Publications

The transactions of the academy (Vetenskapsakademiens handlingar) were published as its main series between 1739 and 1974. In parallel, other major series have appeared and gone:
 Öfversigt af Kungl. Vetenskapsakademiens förhandlingar (1844–1903)
 Bihang till Vetenskapsakademiens Handlingar (1872–1902)
 Vetenskapsakademiens årsbok (1903–1969)

The academy started publishing annual reports in physics and chemistry (1826), technology (1827), botany (1831), and zoology (1832). These lasted into the 1860s, when they were replaced by the single Bihang series (meaning: supplement to the transactions). Starting in 1887, this series was once again split into four sections (afdelning), which in 1903 became independent scientific journals of their own, titled "Arkiv för..." (archive for...). These included:
 Arkiv för botanik (1903–1974)
 Arkiv för kemi, mineralogi och geologi (1903–1949)
 Arkiv för matematik, astronomi och fysik (1903–1949)
 Arkiv för Zoologi (1903–1974)

Further restructuring of their topics occurred in 1949 and 1974. Other defunct journals of the academy include:
 Electronic Transactions on Artificial Intelligence (1997–2001)

Current publications
 Ambio (1972–)
 Acta Mathematica (1882–)
 Arkiv för Matematik (1949– with this title; 1903–1949 also including physics and astronomy)
 Acta Zoologica (1920–)
 Levnadsteckningar över Vetenskapsakademiens ledamöter (1869–), biographies of deceased members
 Porträttmatrikel (1971–), portraits of current members
 Zoologica Scripta (1972–), jointly with the Norwegian Academy of Science and Letters

History
The academy was founded on 2 June 1739 by naturalist Carl Linnaeus, mercantilist Jonas Alströmer, mechanical engineer Mårten Triewald, civil servants Sten Carl Bielke and Carl Wilhelm Cederhielm, and statesman/author Anders Johan von Höpken.

The purpose of the academy was to focus on practically useful knowledge, and to publish in Swedish in order to widely disseminate the academy's findings. The academy was intended to be different from the Royal Society of Sciences in Uppsala, which had been founded in 1719 and published in Latin. The location close to the commercial activities in Sweden's capital (which unlike Uppsala did not have a university at this time) was also intentional. The academy was modeled after the Royal Society of London and Academie Royale des Sciences in Paris, France, which some of the founding members were familiar with.

See also 
 Members of the Royal Swedish Academy of Sciences

References

External links 
 
 Royal Swedish Academy of Sciences video site

 
Sweden
1739 establishments in Sweden
Sciences, Academy
Academy, Science
Buildings and structures in Stockholm
Science and technology in Sweden
Scientific organizations established in 1739
Members of the International Council for Science
Members of the International Science Council